Víctor Estrella Burgos was the defending champion but lost in the first round to Federico Delbonis.

Christian Garín won the title after defeating Delbonis 6–4, 5–7, 6–4 in the final.

Seeds

Draw

Finals

Top half

Bottom half

References
Main Draw
Qualifying Draw

Milex Open - Singles
2018 Singles